Peter Farrer (20 May 1926 – 10 February 2017) was an English tax inspector,  author, cross-dresser, and authority on women's fashion.

Selected publications
 The Life of Maurice Pollack, 1885-1918: A Birmingham Actor
 Cross Dressing Between the Wars: Selections from London Life 1923-1933
 In Female Disguise
 My First Party Frock and Other Contributions to the Glad Rag 1985 to 1991
 The Regime of the Stay-lace: Further Selection of Letters from Victorian Newspapers
 Men in Petticoats: A Selection of Letters from Victorian Newspapers
 Borrowed Plumes: Letters from Edwardian Newspapers on Male Cross Dressing
 Tight Lacing: 1828-1880 Pt. 1: A Bibliography of Articles and Letters Concerning Stays and Corsets for Men and Women Confidential Correspondence on Cross Dressing: 1911-15 Pt. 1 Cross Dressing Since the War: Selections from Justice Weekly 1955-1972 Confidential Correspondence on Cross Dressing: 1916-20 Pt. 2 Happenings: The Story of Bessie''

References

External links

People from Surrey
English civil servants
Cross-dressers
People educated at King William's College
Alumni of St John's College, Oxford
English publishers (people)
1926 births
2017 deaths
20th-century English businesspeople